Younes Alaiwi Al-Enezi (born January 26, 1990) is a Saudi football player who plays a forward for Al-Khaleej.

External links
 

1990 births
Living people
Saudi Arabian footballers
Al Batin FC players
Al-Raed FC players
Al Hilal SFC players
Al-Shoulla FC players
Khaleej FC players
Place of birth missing (living people)
Saudi First Division League players
Saudi Professional League players
Saudi Second Division players
Association football forwards